The 2013 European Eventing Championship was held from August 29 to September 1, 2013, in Malmö, Sweden.

Results 
Venue: Malmö, Sweden
Team gold:  Germany 
Team silver:  Sweden 
Team bronze:  France 
Individual gold:  Michael Jung/Halunke FBW (GER)
Individual silver:  Ingrid Klimke/FRH Escada JS (GER)
Individual bronze:   William Fox-Pitt/Chilli Morning (GBR)

External links 
 

Eventing
Equestrian sports competitions in Sweden
Eventing
2013 in Swedish sport
International sports competitions hosted by Sweden
European Eventing Championships